Nanette Gwen Medved (born January 21, 1970) is a philanthropist, businesswoman, and former actress and model in the Philippines. She is the founder and chairwoman of Hope. She was honoured with a resolution passed by the Philippine House of Representatives, HR No. 1198, for being included in the Forbes list of Heroes of Philanthropy  and has been awarded the NGO Leadership Award and Social Innovation Leadership Award from the Philippines Leadership Awards.

Career
In 2011, Medved founded Friends of HOPE, Inc., a non-profit that invests in education, provides agriculture interventions, and creates carbon sequestration opportunities in the Philippines. It uses the profits from Generation HOPE to build public school classrooms in the Philippines. They work closely with the Department of Education to determine which areas are most in need through the adopt-a-school program.

In 2014, she founded Generation HOPE, the Philippines' first Certified B-Corporation, a social enterprise that produces packaged water known as "Hope in a Bottle," "Hope in a Box" and "(Not Just) Tubig," and builds public school classrooms across the Philippines. In 2015, HOPE was recognized globally as the Best New Brand and having the Best Community Initiative by the Global Bottled Water Awards. In 2017, HOPE was awarded the grand prize at the Developmental Social Enterprise Awards by PricewaterhouseCoopers and Benita & Catalino Yap Foundation. In 2020, HOPE in a Box was awarded the Best CSR Initiative in Global Water Drinks Awards.

In 2019, she founded PCX (PCX Markets, Inc. and PCX Solutions, Inc.), the world's first non-profit plastic credit program. Founded in one of the epicenters of the plastic pollution crisis, the Philippines, PCX Solutions advises companies around the world on how to map out and execute comprehensive solution sets effectively over a partner's sustainability journey. PCX established a Plastic Pollution Reduction Standard and recycle plastic waste with programs that aim to reduce the flow of plastic pollution into nature.

From 2007 to 2012, Medved served on the advisory board of Bantay Bata. In 2012, she began to serve on the National Advisory Council of World Wildlife Fund Philippines and in 2019, she was invited to serve on its board of trustees. In July 2019, she began to serve as part of the Board of Directors of Winrock International Arlington, Virginia. In the same year, she was appointed the first chairperson of the Po Family Council, a leadership and governance forum for the Po family.

Prior to her philanthropic work, Medved had a career as a commercial model and an actress. She was cast as Darna in Darna (1991). In 1996, she left the Philippines to pursue studies in the United States. In 2002, she decided to leave the entertainment industry to focus on her advocacy work.

Personal life

Medved was born in Hawaii to a Russian father and a Chinese mother. She grew up traveling throughout Asia and spent most of her primary and secondary education in Holy Family Academy, Angeles City, Philippines. She initially took courses in De La Salle University - College of St. Benilde, and later opted to study abroad. She graduated Summa Cum Laude with degrees in Finance and Entrepreneurship from Babson College in Massachusetts.

Medved married businessman Christopher Po in South Africa in 1999. The couple have two sons.

Filmography

Film
Eastwood and Bronson (1989)
Bakit Ikaw Pa Rin? (1990)
Sa Diyos Lang Ako Susuko (1990)
Biktima (1990)
Huwag Mong Salingin Ang Sugat Ko (1991)
Humanap Ka ng Panget (1991)
Sa Kabila ng Lahat (1991)
Hinukay Ko Na Ang Libingan Mo! (1991)
Andrew Ford Medina: 'Wag Kang Gamol! (1991)
Darna (1991)
Narito Ang Puso Ko (1992)
Hiram Na Mukha (1992)
Dito Sa Pitong Gatang (1992) 
Dillinger (1992)
Kapag May Gusot Walang Lusot (1993)
Isang Bala Ka Lang Part 2 (1993)
Tumbasan Mo Ng Buhay (1993)
An Lian Ni (1993)
Iukit Mo Sa Bala! (1994)
Hataw Tatay Hataw (1994)
Pamilya Valderama (1995)
Pag-ibig Ko Sa Iyo'y Totoo (1997) 
Kasangga Mo Ako Sa Huling Laban (1997)
Goodbye America (1997)
Ang Dalubhasa (2000)

Television
Love Me Doods (1990) 
Kate en Boogie (1993)
Compañero y Compañera (2000-2001)

References

External links

Living people
1970 births
Actresses from Honolulu
RPN News and Public Affairs people
Filipino people of Chinese descent
Filipino female models
Filipino film actresses
Filipino television actresses
Filipino people of Russian descent
20th-century Filipino actresses
21st-century Filipino actresses
21st-century American women